or Kenzi is a masculine Japanese given name.
ANIL

Possible writings
Kenji can be written using different kanji characters and can mean:
賢二, "wise, second"
健二, "healthy, second"
健次, "healthy, next"
謙二, "modest, second"
研二, "research, second"
憲次, "constitution, next"
健司, "healthy, rule"
健治, "healthy, govern"
賢治, "wise, govern"
健児, "healthy, child"
堅志, "iron, purpose" 
謙, modest

People with the name

 Kenji Anan (健治, born 1962), Japanese stage and film actor
 Kenji Daimanazuru (健司, born 1977), Japanese sumo wrestler
 Kenji Doihara (賢二, 1883–1948), Japanese military general
 Kenji Eda (憲司, born 1956), Japanese politician
 Kenji Fujimori (born 1980), Peruvian politician, son of ex-president Alberto Fujimori
, Japanese handball player
 Kenji Fukuda (born 1977), Japanese footballer for Ehime F.C.
 Kenji Goto (後藤 健二) (1967-2015) Japanese freelance video journalist, killed by ISIL
, Japanese footballer
 Kenji Hatanaka (健二, 1923–1945), Japanese soldier
, Japanese anime producer
Kenji Imai (disambiguation), multiple people
, Japanese shogi player
, Japanese sport wrestler
 Kenji Ishiguro (健治, born 1935), Japanese photographer
, Japanese swimmer
, Japanese video game composer and musician
, Japanese footballer
 Kenji Jasper, American writer
 Kenji Johjima (健司, born 1976), Japanese Major League Baseball catcher
, Japanese footballer
 Kenji Kamiyama (健治, born 1966), Japanese anime director
, Japanese rower
, Japanese shogi player
, Japanese table tennis player
 Kenji Kawai (憲次, born 1957), Japanese music composer
 Kenji Kawakami (賢司, born 1946), inventor of the Japanese craze Chindōgu
, Japanese martial artist and actor
 Kenji Kimihara (健二, born 1941), Japanese long-distance runner
, Japanese volleyball player
, Japanese footballer
, Japanese shogi player
 Kenji Kosaka (憲次, born 1946), Japanese politician
 J. Kenji López-Alt, American chef and food writer
 Kenji Matsuda (賢二, born 1971), Japanese actor
 Kenji Miyamoto (figure skater), (born 1978)
 Kenji Miyamoto (politician), (1908-2007)
 Kenji Miyazawa (賢治, 1896–1933), Japanese poet and author of children's literature
 Kenji Mizoguchi (健二, 1898–1956), Japanese film director
 Kenji Nagai (健司, 1957–2007), Japanese photographer
 Kenji Nagasaki (長崎健司), Japanese director
 Kenji Nakagami (健次, 1946–1992), Japanese author
, Japanese anime director
, Japanese sailor
 Kenji Nojima (健児, born 1976), Japanese voice actor
 Kenji Nomura (born 1970), Japanese voice actor
 Kenji Ogiwara (健司, born 1969), Japanese Nordic combined skier
 Kenji Ohtsuki (ケンヂ, born 1966), Japanese heavy metal rock musician
 Kenji Otonari (born 1984), Japanese Baseball pitcher
 Kenji Sahara (健二, born 1932), Japanese actor
, Japanese baseball player
, Japanese basketball player and coach
 Kenji Sawada (研二, born 1948), Japanese actor and singer
, Japanese volleyball player
, Japanese basketball player
 Kenji Suzuki (健二, born 1929), Japanese NHK announcer
 Kenji Tabata (健児, born 1974), Japanese sprinter
, Japanese footballer
, Japanese footballer
, Japanese sailor
 Patrick Kenji Takahashi (born 1940), American biochemical engineer and science writer
, Japanese footballer
 Kenji Terada (憲史, born 1952), Japanese script writer, anime director, novelist, and scenario writer
 Kenji Tokitsu (born 1947), Japanese author and martial artist
 Kenji Tomiki (謙治, 1900–1979), Japanese aikidoka and judoka
, Japanese actor
, Japanese ice hockey player
 Kenji Treschuk (born 1982), American soccer defender
 Kenji Tsukagoshi (賢爾, 1900–1943), Japanese aviator and explorer
 Kenji Tsumura (健志, born 1986), professional Magic: The Gathering player
 Kenji Tsuruta (謙二, born 1961), Japanese manga artist and illustrator
 Kenji Ueda (born 1965), Japanese musician better known as Kenzi
 Kenji Utsumi (賢二, 1937–2013), Japanese actor
 Kenji Waki (謙二, born 1960), Japanese shogi player
 Kenji Watanabe (born 1969), Japanese breaststroke swimmer
 Kenji Williams, American filmmaker, electronic music producer, and violinist
 Kenji Wu (born 1979), a Taiwanese singer and actor
, Japanese boxer
, Japanese anime producer and illustrator
Michael Kenji Shinoda (born 1977), American musician

Fictional characters
 Kenji in the real-time strategy game Battle Realms
 Kenji Delos Reyes from the Filipino novel "She's Dating the Gangster"
 Kenji, the main character in the 2003 Thai film Last Life in the Universe
 Kenji, a character in the video game Need for Speed: Carbon
 Kenji (ケンジ a.k.a. Tracey Sketchit) in the Pokémon anime and manga series Electric Tale of Pikachu
 Kenji Kasen, a Yakuza boss in Grand Theft Auto III
 Kenji Tenzai from Command & Conquer: Red Alert 3
 Kenji, Dragonfly Jones' student/rival in the TV show Martin
 Kenji in the video game Red Earth (Warzard)
 Kenji in Sports Champions
 Kenji Endō (健児), the protagonist in the manga series 20th Century Boys
 Kenji Harima (拳児), the main character from the manga and anime series School Rumble
 Kenji Himura (剣路) in the manga series Rurouni Kenshin
Kenji Maezono, a character in the film Battle Royale II: Requiem
 Kenji Muto in the fantasy novel series Tales of the Otori
 Kenji Tomochika in the game Shin Megami Tensei: Persona 3 responsible for the "Magician" social link
 Kenji Tsukino (謙之), a minor character in Sailor Moon media
 Kenji Lee, Inspector Lee's brother in Rush Hour 3
 Kenji Setou, a legally blind character in Katawa Shoujo
 Karate Kenji, the main character from the manga and anime series Fight Fever
 Kenji Ookami, Tooey's father of Japanese descent in Molly of Denali
 Kenji Kon from Jurassic World Camp Cretaceous
 Kenji the Japanese Rail Zeppelin from Thomas & Friends, introduced in Series 24.
Kenji Miyazawa in anime and manga "Bungo Stray Dogs" 
Kenji Yamaguchi in anime and manga "My Little Monster"

See also
Kenji (disambiguation)
Kenji Mizoguchi: The Life of a Film Director, a 1975 Japanese documentary film

Japanese masculine given names